El Castillo del Terror is a professional wrestling event produced and scripted annually by the lucha Libre promotion International Wrestling Revolution Group (IWRG). The event was established in 2000 and is held in November each year in Arena Naucalpan, IWRG's main arena in Naucalpan, State of Mexico. The annual show features the eponymous main event match; a multi-man Steel Cage Match where the last man in the cage is forced to unmask under Luchas de Apuestas, or "Bet rules". In rival Mexican promotion Consejo Mundial de Lucha Libre (CMLL) the match is referred to as Infierno en el Ring, but is the same concept. The 2015 event marked the fifteenth time that IWRG has held a Castillo del Terror event and the fourth time that Golden Magic has won the mask of an opponent by being the last man to escape the cage; unmasking King Drako, Alan Extreme, Kenshin Kabuki and El Golpelador.

A total of 116 wrestlers have participated in one or more Castillo del Terror cage matches, with Oficial 911 holding a record of eight matches in total; Golden Magic is the only wrestler to have won multiple matches, four. Yack has  participate under two different names, working as "Bakteria" in 2006 and Jack/Yack in 2008 and 2009. |Oficial Factor previously wrestled and lost a Castillo del Terror match under the name "Mega", while Oficial 911 previous wrestled under the name "Comando Mega". Wrestlers from IWRG, CMLL, Lucha Libre AAA World Wide (AAA) and the Mexican Independent circuit have all participated in a Castillo del Terror match. IWRG holds several multi-man steel cage Luchas de Apuesta matches throughout the year, but only refer to the November show match as the Castillo del Terror. Events with a similar match in the main event includes Guerra de Sexos and Guerra del Golfo. Being professional wrestling events matches are not won legitimately; they are instead won via predetermined outcomes to the matches that is kept secret from the general public.

List of El Castillo del Terror winners

Dates, venues and main events

References

External links